The 1981-82 Northern League season was the 16th and last season of the Northern League, the top level ice hockey league in northern England and Scotland. Eight teams participated in the league, and the Dundee Rockets won the championship. The top four teams qualified for the Spring Cup, which served as the Northern League playoffs. The top two teams, the Dundee Rockets and the Murrayfield Racers, qualified for the British Championship.

Regular season

Spring Cup

Semifinals
Murrayfield Racers - Fife Flyers 3:2, 4:1
Dundee Rockets - Durham Wasps 24:1, 12:7

Final
Dundee Rockets - Murrayfield Racers 10:4, 14:2

External links
 Season on hockeyarchives.info

Northern
Northern League (ice hockey, 1966–1982) seasons